Cartoon Network Speedway is a kart racing video game released for the Game Boy Advance in 2003. Published by Majesco Entertainment and developed by DC Studios, the game features characters from Cartoon Network's original animated television series; Ed, Edd n Eddy, Johnny Bravo, Courage the Cowardly Dog, Cow and Chicken, and Sheep in the Big City.

Reception
The game received mixed reviews by critics and gamers alike. On IGN, it received a 3 out of 10, reviewer Craig Harris stating "Cartoon Network Speedway is one of the sloppiest and most generic kart racers released on the Game Boy Advance." It currently has a 53% rating on GameRankings. It was also given a 65 out of 100 from Next Level Gaming, a 3 out of 5 from Nintendo Power, and 58 out of 100 from VG-Force. Complaints centered on bad and choppy graphics, the slow pace, the fact that characters from Dexter's Laboratory and The Powerpuff Girls (both popular Cartoon Network franchises) were unavailable, and the lack of challenge.

References

External links
 

2003 video games
Crossover racing games
Game Boy Advance games
Game Boy Advance-only games
North America-exclusive video games
Kart racing video games
Cartoon Network video games
Video games developed in Canada
DC Studios games
Single-player video games
Majesco Entertainment games